Health problems have been a long-standing issue limiting development in the Democratic Republic of the Congo (DR Congo).

The Human Rights Measurement Initiative finds that the Democratic Republic of the Congo is fulfilling 73.1% of what it should be fulfilling for the right to health based on its level of income. When looking at the right to health with respect to children, the Democratic Republic of the Congo achieves 96.6% of what is expected based on its current income. In regards to the right to health amongst the adult population, the country achieves 100.0% of what is expected based on the nation's level of income.  The Democratic Republic of the Congo falls into the "very bad" category when evaluating the right to reproductive health because the nation is fulfilling only 22.8% of what the nation is expected to achieve based on the resources (income) it has available.

Health infrastructure 

Medical facilities are severely limited, medical materials are in short supply. An adequate supply of prescription or over-the-counter drugs in local stores or pharmacies is also generally not available. Payment for any medical services is expected in cash in the DR Congo, in advance of treatment.

Health status

Life expectancy 

In 2018, the CIA estimated the average life expectancy in the DR Congo to be 60.3 years: 59 for the male population and 61.6 for females (est. 2017.)

Malaria
Malaria is a major health problem in the DR Congo. Malaria is the principal cause of morbidity and mortality, accounting for more than 40 percent of all outpatient visits and for 19 percent of deaths among children under five years of age. Given that the majority of the population lives in high transmission zones, it has been estimated that the DRC accounts for 11 percent of all cases of malaria in sub-Saharan Africa. The National Malaria Control Strategic Plan 2016–2020 (NSP) introduced the stratification of provinces based on parasite prevalence as measured by the 2013 Demographic and Health Survey (DHS). This approach allows the NSP to focus high-impact interventions in the areas that bear the greatest disease burden. In line with this strategy, international donors are concentrating their efforts in 9 out of 26 provinces (Kasai Oriental, Haut Katanga, Haut Lomami, Tanganyika, Lualaba, Sankuru, Lomami, Kasai Central, and Sud Kivu). According to the 2013 DHS, progress is being made in key malaria interventions, such as insecticide-treated net ownership and use. Additionally, mortality rates for children under five years of age fell by 34 percent and the incidence rate fell by 40 percent between 2010 and 2018.

Other endemic diseases 
Yellow fever and any other insect-borne illnesses are present as well.

HIV/AIDS 

HIV/Aids is the most serious health problem in the DR Congo due to the incurable nature of the disease. By the end of 2003, UNAIDS estimated that 1.1 million people were living with HIV/AIDS, for an overall adult HIV prevalence of 4.2%. Life expectancy in the DR Congo dropped 9% in the 1990s as a result of HIV/AIDS.According to UNAIDS, several factors fuel the spread of HIV in the DR Congo, including the movement of large numbers of refugees and soldiers, scarcity and high cost of safe blood transfusions in rural areas, a lack of counseling, few HIV testing sites, high levels of untreated sexually transmitted infections among sex workers and their clients, and low availability of condoms outside Kinshasa and one or two provincial capitals.

With an eventual end of hostilities and a government in transition, population movements associated with increased stability and economic revitalization will exacerbate the spread of HIV, which is now localized in areas most directly affected by the presence of troops and war-displaced populations. Consecutive wars have made it nearly impossible to conduct effective and sustainable HIV/AIDS prevention activities.

Cholera 
Although incidence and mortality from cholera can be difficult to estimate, particularly given the DRC's lack of resources and inadequate surveillance systems, several studies demonstrate that the DRC experiences a significant burden of disease. In 2015, 19,705 cases of cholera were reported in the DRC. Few cases are laboratory-confirmed, so the incidence of cholera can be under-estimated.

The highest annual attack rates occurred in 2011 in the Eastern provinces of the Democratic Republic of Congo that border the Great Lakes. These provinces are Orientale, North and South Kivu, Katanga and Kasai Oriental. North and South Kivu as well as Katanga had the highest attack rate with over 10 cases per 100,000 people, every year between 2000 and 2011.  The high annual attack rates occurred in the Eastern provinces because there is an environmental reservoir for V. cholerae in the lakes of the rift valley. Additionally, there are seasonal peaks that usually occur during the first quarter of the year which also increases the attack rate. Furthermore, fishermen travel from the eastern lakes in the Democratic Republic of Congo to larger cities at the end of the dry season which gives way to seasonal variations in incidence of Cholera. Cross-border cholera remains difficult to track due to the lack of collaboration and communication between the Sub-Saharan countries.

Disease outbreaks 

There have been 10 outbreaks of the Ebola virus disease in the Democratic Republic of the Congo. Additionally, hemorrhagic fever, polio, cholera, and typhoid, while tuberculosis is an increasingly serious health concern in the DR Congo.

In 2019 a measles outbreak claimed more deaths than Ebola.

River blindness 

People are at risk of onchocerciasis (River blindness) in parts of the DR Congo.

Maternal and child healthcare 
The 2010 maternal mortality rate per 100,000 births for Democratic Republic of the Congo is 670. This is compared with 533.6 in 2008 and 550 in 1990. The under 5 mortality rate, per 1,000 births is 199 and the neonatal mortality as a percentage of under 5's mortality is 26. In Democratic Republic of the Congo the number of midwives per 1,000 live births is 2 and the lifetime risk of death for pregnant women 1 in 24.

Nutrition

The DRC nutritional situation is still alarming despite global health progress. More than half (69%) of its population suffers from undernutrition The prevalence of stunting is 43% among children under 5 years old, with 14% of women in childbearing age; 8% for wasting with 3% of Severe Acute Malnutrition in children under 5 years old and finally 23% for underweight in children of the same age group. Stunting prevalence still higher and remains the most common of undernutrition in the country according to the Demographic and Health Survey 2013–2014 of DRC. Undernutrition has significant long term impact on the cognitive development of children, particularly those under 5 years old and of women in childbearing age previously malnourished. Consequently, affect human capital and the country's economic productivity. Undernutrition common indicators recommended by WHO include anthropometric measurements, biochemical indicators and clinical signs of undernutrition.
Micronutrient deficiencies in DRC are caused mostly by food deprivation and poverty, with a particularly high incidence of vitamin A deficiency 61%; iron deficiency with 47% among children under 5 years old, 38% among women in reproductive age and 23% men.
The improvement of the nutritional status of the population, particularly those of children under 5 and women of childbearing age, would reduce the mortality rate in this age group and make progress on Health Outcome Indicators specially the achievement of objective 3 of sustainable development, which aims to ensure a healthy life and promote the well-being of all at all ages. Hence on human capital, economic productivity and development.

See also 
 Ministry of Health (Democratic Republic of the Congo)
 Graham Toulmin AM and Wendy Toulmin AM, dental clinic philanthropists

References

External links 
 World Health Organization (WHO) – Democratic Republic of Congo
 The State of the World's Midwifery – D.R.Congo Country Profile